Wild Child is the fourth single from Australian pop prodigy Elen Levon. It was released in mid-2013 and became her best charting single thus far. The music video which was directed by Prad Senanayake and was released via Ministry of Sounds YouTube channel on July 14, 2013 with the tracks digital release following on the 19th of August.

Track listing
Digital Single
 Wild Child

Reception
Reception for the single has been mostly positive with many liking Levon's transition from dance/club anthems to a more organic sound. David from 'Pop On And On' gave the single a positive review stating that the song "...begins with piano driven beauty before soaring into head boppin’, drum bangin’ heights on the chorus. The execution here is flawless, her vocals are on point and the production holds all the right elements without trying too hard. I'm so ready for Levon to make some waves stateside. Richard from DjBooth commented that Levon sounds somewhat like Rihanna.
The single was certified gold in Italy for 15.000 copies sold.

Charts

Certifications

References

2013 songs
Ministry of Sound singles
Song recordings produced by Orange Factory Music
2013 singles
Elen Levon songs